St. Davnet's Hospital is a psychiatric hospital in Monaghan, County Monaghan, Republic of Ireland.

History
The hospital, which was designed by John McCurdy, was opened as the Cavan and Monaghan District Lunatic Asylum in 1869. Two chapels were built, one for catholic patients and the other for protestant patients, and these were renovated by William Alphonsus Scott in 1910.

The Irish republican, Peadar O'Donnell, was regarded as the first Irish person to use the term "occupation" in relation to the occupation of a workplace, when he and the staff of the hospital occupied the site in 1919. "The occupation was, in fact, the first action in Ireland to describe itself as a soviet, and the Red Flag was raised above the hospital." It became Monaghan Mental Hospital in the late 1920s and  St. Davnet's Hospital in the 1950s.

After the introduction of deinstitutionalisation in the late 1980s the hospital went into a period of decline and activities became focused on Blackwater House.

References

Hospitals in County Monaghan
Davnets
Hospital buildings completed in 1869
1869 establishments in Ireland
Hospitals established in 1869
Health Service Executive hospitals